The 2014 Castrol Townsville 500 - Driven by TAFE Queensland was a motor race meeting for the Australian sedan-based V8 Supercars. It was the seventh event of the 2014 International V8 Supercars Championship. It was held on the weekend of 4–6 July at the Townsville Street Circuit, at Townsville, Queensland.

References 

Townsville